Sri sri Batadrava than or bordowa than, bordowa for short is a holy pilgrimage site in Assam. Srimanta Sankardev was born in 1449 in Bordowa. Bordowa than is also a place of childhood, adolescence and career of Mahapurush Srimanta Sankardeva. The satra belongs to the sect known as the Purasamhati and the satraadhikar is chosen from a Brahmin or a Kayastha family. The satra brought back caste rules and brahminical rituals to a greater or lesser extent deviating from teachings of Sankardeva.

The pilgrimage site is located at Batadrava, about 16 km from Nagaon city. In 1468, at the age of 19, Srimanta Sankaradev established sri sri Batadrava than in Bordowa. Another feature of Bordowa than is that it is the first Than or Namghar in the world founded by Sankaradev. And from here Sankardev spread Ekasarana Dharma all over India . Bordowa than covers an area of 286 bighas.

History

Satra

Management

Festivals and Events

Notes

References
 

 

Hindu pilgrimage sites in India
Assam